Tennga is a small unincorporated community in Murray County, Georgia, United States, along U.S. Route 411 near the Tennessee border.

History
The border community's name is locational, being a portmanteau of the "Tenn." and "Ga." state abbreviations.

On March 28, 2000, Tennga was the site of a collision between Murray County School District school bus number 98-08 and a 33-car southbound CSX freight train led by GE C40-8 7580, which resulted in the deaths of three children at a railroad crossing. The railroad roughly parallels U.S. 411, and is likewise a well-used shortcut around Chattanooga for traffic between Atlanta and Knoxville.

One of the students aboard the school bus reported that the bus driver, Rhonda Clure, did not follow the federal law to stop, flash hazard lights, open the doors and slide open the window to listen for the train. She also did not turn off the cassette tape off and just rolled right over the crossing without stopping. The crossing was on Liberty Church Road in Georgia.

CSX Train 7580 slams into the school bus at 6:40 am, with the impact being so violent that the bus body ripped apart from the frame and bent into a U-shape. The damage was similar to what happened at Fox River Grove in Illinois when a Metra train hit a bus that was stopped on the track by a red light on the other side.

Geography
The area is served by Rostex Airport, which has a single paved runway.

References

Unincorporated communities in Murray County, Georgia
Unincorporated communities in Georgia (U.S. state)